The 1871 Nova Scotia general election was held on 16 May 1871 to elect members of the 25th House of Assembly of the Province of Nova Scotia, Canada. It was won by the Liberal party.

Results

Results by party

Retiring incumbents
Liberal
Henry Balcom, Halifax
Robert Chambers, Colchester
James Cochran, Halifax
Josiah Hooper, Richmond
Amos Purdy, Cumberland
Martin Isaac Wilkins, Pictou
Elkanah Young, Hants

Nominated candidates
1871 Nova Scotia Provincial Election

Legend
bold denotes party leader
† denotes an incumbent who is not running for re-election or was defeated in nomination contest

Valley

|-
| rowspan="2"|Annapolis
||
|Jared C. Troop1,08326.03%	
|
|Avard Longley1,01724.44%	
||
|Jared C. Troop
|-
||
|David C. Landers1,07625.86%	
|
|T. W. Chesley98523.67%	
||
|David C. Landers
|-
| rowspan="2"|Digby
||
|William Berrian Vail1,02835.83%	
|
|Colin Campbell72125.13%	
||
|William Berrian Vail
|-
||
|Urbine Doucette1,01935.52%	
|
|A. Amirault1013.52%	
||
|Urbine Doucette
|-
| rowspan="2"|Hants
|
|William Dawson Lawrence1,18322.43%
||
|William Henry Allison1,44627.42%	
||
|William Dawson Lawrence
|-	
|
|Frederick Curry1,24923.68%	
||
|William McDougall1,39626.47%
||
|Elkanah Young†
|-
| rowspan="2"|Kings	
|
|David M. Dickie79621.68%
||
|Daniel Charles Moore1,09429.80%	
||
|David M. Dickie
|-	
|
|Edward L. Brown79721.71%
||
|Douglas Benjamin Woodworth98426.80%	
||
|Edward L. Brown
|-
|}

South Shore

|-
| rowspan="2"|Lunenburg
||
|Mather Byles DesBrisayAcclamation	
|
|
||
|Mather Byles DesBrisay
|-
||
|James Daniel EisenhauerAcclamation	
|
|	
||
|James Daniel Eisenhauer
|-
| rowspan="2"|Queens
||
|William Henry Smith82633.59%
|
|Thomas Patillo46518.91%	
||
|William Henry Smith
|-
||
|Samuel Freeman82933.71%	
|
|Will Hendry33913.79%	
||
|Samuel Freeman
|-
| rowspan="2"|Shelburne
||
|Thomas Johnston82630.72%	
|
|William F. MacCoy57021.20%	
||
|Thomas Johnston
|-
||
|Robert Robertson76528.45%	
|
|J. H. Kendrick52819.64%	
||
|Robert Robertson
|-
| rowspan="3"|Yarmouth
||
|Albert Gayton71425.71%	
|rowspan=2|
|rowspan=2|John Van Norden Hatfield39714.30%	
|rowspan=2 |
|rowspan=2|John K. Ryerson
|-
|
|John K. Ryerson63622.90%
|-
||
|William H. Townsend65923.73%	
|
|N. Churchill37113.36%	
||
|William H. Townsend
|-
|}

Fundy-Northeast

|-
| rowspan="2"|Colchester
||
|Thomas Fletcher MorrisonAcclamation
|
|
||
|Thomas Fletcher Morrison
|-	
|
|	
||
|Samuel RettieAcclamation	
||
|Robert Chambers†
|-
| rowspan="2"|Cumberland	
|
|George Hibbard1,04320.14%
||
|Henry Gesner Pineo Jr.1,60531.00%	
||
|Henry Gesner Pineo Jr.
|-	
|
|J. K. Kiderkin94618.27%
||
|Edward Vickery1,58430.59%	
||
|Amos Purdy†
|-
|}

Halifax

|-
| rowspan="3"|Halifax
||
|William Garvie2,75217.66%	
|
|Philip Carteret Hill2,49716.02%	
||
|Philip Carteret Hill
|-
||
|John Flinn2,70417.35%	
|
|M. B. Daly2,49215.99%	
||
|James Cochran†
|-
||
|Donald Archibald2,69317.28%	
|
|J. Geddes2,44815.71%	
||
|Henry Balcom†
|-
|}

Central Nova

|-

| rowspan="2"|Antigonish
||
|Daniel MacDonald1,05230.62%	
|
|R. N. Henry85324.83%	
||
|Daniel MacDonald
|-
||
|Joseph MacDonald97828.46%	
|
|Angus McGillivray55316.09%	
||
|Joseph MacDonald
|-
| rowspan="2"|Guysborough
||
|John Angus Kirk74525.86%	
|
|Joseph William Hadley70624.51%	
||
|John Angus Kirk
|-
||
|William Henry Wylde74325.79%	
|
|Alexander N. McDonald68723.85%	
||
|William Henry Wylde
|-
| rowspan="3"|Pictou	
|
|George Murray1,95515.68%
||
|James McDonald2,27018.21%	
||
|George Murray
|-	
|
|John D. McLeod1,92715.46%
||
|Simon Hugh Holmes2,24217.98%	
||
|Martin Isaac Wilkins†
|-	
|
|Robert S. Copeland1,88415.11%
||
|Hugh J. Cameron2,18817.55%	
||
|Robert S. Copeland
|-
|}

Cape Breton

|-
| rowspan="2"|Cape Breton
||
|Alonzo J. White1,32942.26%	
|
|Newton LeGayet Mackay82426.20%	
||
|Alonzo J. White
|-
||
|John Fergusson99231.54%	
|
|	
||
|John Fergusson
|-
| rowspan="2"|Inverness	
|
|Alexander Campbell1,28024.15%
||
|Hiram Blanchard1,42726.92%	
||
|Alexander Campbell
|-	
|
|Hugh McDonald1,26523.87%
||
|Samuel McDonnell1,32825.06%	
||
|Hugh McDonald
|-
| rowspan="2"|Richmond
||
|Edmund Power Flynn49239.17%
|
|
||
|Edmund Power Flynn
|-	
|
|Isidore LeBlanc31725.24%	
||
|Murdoch McRae44735.59%	
||
|Josiah Hooper†
|-
| rowspan="2"|Victoria
||
|John Ross50527.79%
|
|David McCurdy38321.08%	
||
|John Ross
|-	
|
|William Kidston40622.34%	
||
|Charles James Campbell52328.78%
||
|William Kidston
|-
|}

References

1871
1871 elections in Canada
1871 in Nova Scotia
May 1871 events